Elmar Gustav Kaljot (15 November 1901 – 8 January 1969) was an Estonian footballer.

Career
Kaljot played 25 times for the Estonian national team between 1923 and 1929. He played for three different teams in Estonian top flight and participated at the 1924 Summer Olympics and won the 1929 Baltic Cup.

He was Estonian champion in five occasions, last two times as a coach. During World War II, he fled to Germany in 1944 and since 1948 he lived in United States until his death in 1969.

Honours
 Estonian Top Division: 1923, 1926, 1928, 1934, 1935

References

1901 births
1969 deaths
Footballers from Tallinn
People from the Governorate of Estonia
Estonian footballers
Estonia international footballers
Footballers at the 1924 Summer Olympics
Olympic footballers of Estonia
JK Tallinna Kalev players
Estonian World War II refugees
Estonian emigrants to the United States
Association football midfielders